I, Colossus is the first studio album released by A Different Breed of Killer. It was released on April 29, 2008 by Rise Records, and produced by Jamie King. This album was released to lukewarm reviews.

I, Colossus is a concept album about a man who was the subject of a genetic experiment gone wrong, and spends 20 years in solitude before emerging to wreak vengeance on his captors, and eventually, the world.

Track listing
"Dawning" - 1:29
"Liberation of a Giant" - 3:06
"The Accidentist" - 3:13
"I, Colossus" - 4:08
"Omega" - 3:21
"Autonomy" - 3:17
"To Dismantle the Architect (The Meeting)" - 3:26
"The Cleansing Apparatus (Feat. Phil Bozeman of Whitechapel)" - 3:07
"The Glorious Fall" - 7:22
"Aural Apocalypse" - 1:20

Credits

 Jesse Mainor − vocals
 Ethan Brown − guitar
 Trevor McKee − guitar
 Louie Thal − bass
 Nija Walker − drums
 Jamie King - Producer
 Phil Bozeman of Whitechapel - guest vocals on "The Cleansing Apparatus"

References

2008 debut albums
A Different Breed of Killer albums
Rise Records albums